Rhopaloblaste elegans is a species of flowering plant in the family Arecaceae. It is found only in Solomon Islands. It is threatened by habitat loss.

References

elegans
Flora of the Solomon Islands (archipelago)
Data deficient plants
Taxonomy articles created by Polbot